Qian Min (August 9, 1915 – January 6, 2016) was a Chinese politician. He was born in Wuxi, Jiangsu. He was the Chinese Communist Party Committee Secretary and Mayor of Chongqing.

References

1915 births
2016 deaths
Chinese Communist Party politicians from Jiangsu
People's Republic of China politicians from Jiangsu
Mayors of Chongqing
Political office-holders in Chongqing
Members of the Standing Committee of the 6th National People's Congress
Members of the Standing Committee of the 7th National People's Congress
Politicians from Wuxi
Government ministers of the People's Republic of China
Chinese centenarians
Men centenarians